I Love Dick is an epistolary novel with autofiction elements,  by American artist and author Chris Kraus. 

Published by Semiotext(e) in 1997, I Love Dick merges fiction and memoir formats to explore the writer's psycho-sexual obsession with the eponymous "Dick", a media theorist and sociologist whose last name is never given over the course of the text, despite other art world personalities appearing as themselves. Critics hailed it as both "radical" and "gossipy" and the book continues to be an interdisciplinary point of reference for writers, artists, art historians and theorists. The book announced Kraus' particular brand of "confessional literature" that she herself described as "lonely girl phenomenology". The writer Rick Moody called it, "one of the most explosive, revealing, lacerating and unusual memoirs ever committed to the page".

I Love Dick is written as a series of love letters written to an addressee who is derived from the real-life cultural critic Dick Hebdige. Hebdige described the novel as a violation of his privacy "Dick"'s sporadic presence in "Chris Kraus"'s life changes her thinking about her marriage (to philosopher and Semiotext(e) founder "Sylvère Lotringer") and to her work, as well.

The Guardian described the novel as "a cult feminist classic" despite its poor reception on release in 1997. 

In 2016, Joey Soloway adapted the novel as a TV series, produced by Amazon Studios. The first season was released on May 12, 2017. It was directed by Joey Soloway and stars Kathryn Hahn and Kevin Bacon.

References

External links
N+1 Magazine write-up.
I Love Dick. The MIT Press.
"I Love Poets: An Interview with Chris Kraus." The Poetry Foundation.
Yale Daily News. Write-up.
"Chris Kraus: The Noir of Dubya, the blankness of suburbia and bringing Baudrillard to sing in the Nevada Desert." Dazed Digital

1997 American novels
Semiotext(e) books
American novels adapted into television shows